is a very small asteroid classified as a near-Earth object of the Earth-crossing Apollo group. When it was discovered by the Pan-STARRS 2 survey on 27 April 2020, the asteroid was initially calculated to have a 10% chance of impact with Earth before being ruled out by improved orbit determinations from additional observations. Although there is now no risk of impact with Earth, it did make a close approach  from Earth on 28 April 2020, with a flyby speed of  relative to Earth. The asteroid will not make any close encounters within  of Earth in the next 100 years.

Observations by Kiso Observatory in Nagano, Japan show that the asteroid rotates extremely rapidly with a rotation period of 3 seconds, making it the fastest-rotating asteroid known . No other near-Earth asteroid of similar size is known to have a rotation period shorter than 10 seconds, which could be attributed to the tangential component of the YORP effect accelerating their rotation far beyond this period. The asteroid exhibits a very small light curve amplitude of 0.07 magnitudes, which either implies a nearly spherical shape or a pole-on rotation during observations.

See also 
 List of fast rotators (minor planets)
 List of asteroid close approaches to Earth in 2020

References

External links 
 
 
 

Minor planet object articles (unnumbered)

20200428
20200427